Rick Yutaka Fowler (born December 13, 1988) is an American professional golfer who plays on the PGA Tour. He was the number one ranked amateur golfer in the world for 36 weeks in 2007 and 2008. On January 24, 2016 he reached a career high fourth in the Official World Golf Ranking following his victory in the Abu Dhabi HSBC Golf Championship.

Amateur career
Fowler was born and raised in Murrieta, California, He attended Murrieta Valley High School. For years, he played only on a driving range and is almost entirely self-taught. In his senior year in high school, Fowler won the SW League Final with a total score of 64-69=133 and led his team to the state final in 2007.

After high school, Fowler attended Oklahoma State University in Stillwater. He posted his first collegiate victory at the Fighting Illini Invitational hosted by the University of Illinois on October 1, 2007, by shooting a 203 (70-63-70) to win the tournament by one stroke.

In the summer of 2005, Fowler won the Western Junior and competed in the U.S. Amateur, where he was defeated by the eventual champion Richie Ramsay.

In 2006, Fowler shot a 137 for two rounds at the U.S. Junior Amateur and was knocked out in the second round of match play. The championship was won by Philip Francis.

Fowler represented the United States in its victory at the 2007 Walker Cup. His record was 2–0 in foursomes and 1–1 in singles making his overall record 3–1. Billy Horschel was his partner for both of their foursome victories. That year Fowler won the Sunnehanna Amateur in June and the Players Amateur in July.

In 2008, Fowler repeated as Sunnehanna Amateur champion. In the first round of the U.S. Open, Fowler shot a −1 (70) and was in a tie for 7th place. He was one of three amateurs to make the cut, along with Derek Fathauer and Michael Thompson. He ended the tournament tied for 60th. In October 2008 Fowler played on the Eisenhower Trophy team that finished second. He was the leading individual player.

In 2009, Fowler made his second and last appearance in the Walker Cup. He won all four matches in which he played as the U.S. won by a seven-point margin. His partner in both foursomes matches was Bud Cauley. He also finished third in the Sunnehanna Amateur in 2009.

Fowler was given the 2008 Ben Hogan Award.

Professional career

2009
In 2009, Fowler had the first runner-up finish of his career on the Nationwide Tour in the Nationwide Children's Hospital Invitational losing in a playoff to Derek Lamely.

After the Walker Cup, Fowler turned professional and played the Albertsons Boise Open on the Nationwide Tour for his pro debut.

In September 2009, it was announced that Fowler signed a multi-year equipment deal with Titleist. He has since signed a deal with Rolex.

Fowler's first PGA Tour event as a professional was the Justin Timberlake Shriners Hospitals for Children Open where he finished tied for seventh. His second PGA Tour event was at the Frys.com Open played at Grayhawk Golf Club in Scottsdale, Arizona. He finished tied for second after losing to Troy Matteson in a three-way playoff that included Jamie Lovemark. Fowler's score of 18-under-par included a hole-in-one on the fifth hole in his final round. Fowler also notched an eagle in each of his four rounds.

In November, he finished T2 with D. A. Points, two shots behind the winner Mark Brooks in the Pebble Beach Invitational an unofficial money event on the PGA Tour.

In December 2009, Fowler successfully gained his PGA Tour card for 2010 through qualifying school, finishing T15.

2010

In February 2010, Fowler finished second at the Waste Management Phoenix Open with a score of 15-under-par at the TPC of Scottsdale course. In June, Fowler notched his third PGA Tour runner-up finish at the Memorial Tournament in Dublin, Ohio. Fowler entered the final round in the lead, but shot a 73 to finish behind Justin Rose, who recorded his first PGA Tour victory. This performance took Fowler into the top 50 of the Official World Golf Ranking.

In September, he signed a clothing deal with Puma. In the same month, he was also chosen as a captain's pick for the U.S. Ryder Cup team. At age 21 years and 9 months when the matches began, Fowler became the youngest U.S. Ryder Cup player of all time, and only European Sergio García was younger when he made his Ryder Cup debut in 1999. Fowler forfeited a hole during foursomes competition on the first match day because of a rules violation, by taking a permissible free drop from muddy conditions in an improper location, a mistake U.S. captain Corey Pavin attributed to Fowler's inexperience. On the final day of the competition in his singles match against Edoardo Molinari, Fowler birdied the last 4 holes to halve the match after having been 4 down after 12 holes.

Fowler won the Rookie of the Year award, controversially claiming the award over Northern Ireland's Rory McIlroy.

2011
In July 2011, Fowler tied the 54-hole lead at the AT&T National, but an early double bogey on Sunday derailed his opportunity for his first PGA Tour win. Two weeks later Fowler finished tied for 5th in The Open Championship at Royal St George's. In August, Fowler finished in a tie for second at the WGC-Bridgestone Invitational behind winner Adam Scott, lifting him to 28 in the world rankings.

At the PGA Championship, Fowler carded 74-69-75-68 to finish with a six-over par total of 286, in a tie for 51st place. Early on the third day Fowler rocketed up the leaderboard with three birdies in the first five holes only to falter later in the round with two triple bogeys, effectively ending his hopes of a first major championship and PGA Tour win.

At the first FedEx Cup playoff event, Fowler finished T52 at The Barclays in the last week in August. The following week he again finished T52 at the Deutsche Bank Championship, the second FedEx Cup playoff event, after carding a disappointing six-over par final round 77. At that point Fowler was positioned 37 in the FedEx Cup points standings and required a strong performance at the BMW Championship to qualify in the top thirty for The Tour Championship; a performance which eluded him, finishing in 48th place. In finishing 43rd in the FedEx Cup, Fowler earned a $132,000 bonus.

In October, Fowler enjoyed his first professional win with victory in the OneAsia Tour's Kolon Korea Open, securing a six-shot victory over Rory McIlroy.

Fowler ended 2011 ranked 32nd in the world.

In September, Fowler, along with Graeme McDowell, was part of the PGA Tour's These Guys are Good campaign.

2012
In May 2012, Fowler won the Wells Fargo Championship in Charlotte on the first extra hole of a sudden-death playoff. Replaying the 18th hole, he defeated Rory McIlroy and D. A. Points with a birdie to gain his first PGA Tour win. Fowler shot a 69 (−3) in the final round to finish in a three-way tie after 72 holes at Quail Hollow Club. This win enabled Fowler to break the top-25 in the world, placing him at number 24. The following week at The Players Championship in Ponte Vedra Beach, Florida, Fowler played the final hole at −11 under par and had a birdie opportunity to bring him within one of leader and eventual winner Matt Kuchar. Fowler, however, pushed his putt to the right and finished in a tie for second, the fifth second-place finish of his career.

2013
In 2013 Fowler finished runner-up in the Australian PGA Championship, four shots behind the tournament winner Adam Scott.

2014
After a tie for fifth at the Masters in April, Fowler had his best finish of 2014 at the U.S. Open at Pinehurst No. 2 in North Carolina. Fowler was runner-up with Erik Compton at −1, best finishes for both at a major, but they were eight strokes behind champion Martin Kaymer. Fowler had another second-place finish, at the Open Championship at Royal Liverpool Golf Club in Hoylake, England. He began the final round six strokes behind Rory McIlroy and finished the day tied for second with Sergio García at −15, two strokes behind McIlroy. At the next major in August, the PGA Championship,  Fowler, Phil Mickelson, Henrik Stenson, and McIlroy battled for the title on a rain-soaked Valhalla Golf Club, near Louisville. Despite holding the lead for a good portion of the day, Fowler tied for third. He was only the third player, along with Jack Nicklaus and Tiger Woods, to have finished in the top 5 in all four majors in one calendar year, but the first not to win (Jordan Spieth became the fourth player in 2015). Fowler had 10 top-10 finishes during the 2013–14 season. His 8th-place finish at The Tour Championship moved him to 10th in the world golf rankings.

2015
After a T-12 finish at the Masters, Fowler earned his first win in over three years with a playoff victory at The Players Championship in May. Trailing Sergio García midway through the final round by five shots, Fowler played the final six holes in 6-under par, including an eagle at the par-5 16th. After a birdie at the famous 17th hole, Fowler's final birdie of the round on 18 left him at 12-under par. Both García and Kevin Kisner had birdie attempts to win at the 18th in regulation, but both missed and the three men went to a three-hole aggregate playoff to decide a winner on holes 16–18. Fowler and Kisner went par-birdie-par to tie at −1 while García's three pars left him at even and he was eliminated. Fowler answered with a shot inside of five feet, and when Kisner's birdie attempt slid by, Fowler responded by making his short birdie to claim the championship. Fowler played his final 10 holes in 8-under par. On July 12, he won the Aberdeen Asset Management Scottish Open on the European Tour, shooting a 12-under-par 268. On September 7, he won the Deutsche Bank Championship, the second FedEx Cup Playoffs event, by one stroke over Henrik Stenson, for his third victory on the PGA Tour.

2016
After finishing fifth in the Hyundai Tournament of Champions in Hawaii, Fowler claimed his first victory of 2016 in the Abu Dhabi HSBC Golf Championship on the European Tour. He shot a final round of 69 to finish one clear of Belgium's Thomas Pieters. Two weeks later, Fowler was in contention to win again but lost out to Japan's Hideki Matsuyama in a playoff at the Waste Management Phoenix Open. On March 7, Fowler sparked fantastic scenes after sinking a hole-in-one with fellow tour pro Luke Donald's pitching wedge to win $1 million for Ernie Els' charity, Els for Autism.

In June, Fowler announced that he would not defend his Scottish Open title at Castle Stuart, citing the tight schedule due to golf's return to the Olympic Games as the main reason. At the 2016 Olympics, he came in 37th place.

At the first FedEx Cup playoff event of the season, The Barclays, Fowler went into the final round leading the event by one stroke. He endured a difficult final round, shooting a two-over-par 74. His challenge was ended with a double-bogey at the 16th hole that put him four strokes behind playing partner Patrick Reed. He went on to finish T7, three strokes behind the winner Reed. As a result of this, Fowler also failed to secure his automatic Ryder Cup spot, which he would have done with a top-three finish. Fowler moved up from 28th to 16th in the FedEx Cup standings with this result.

2017
On February 26, Fowler won The Honda Classic for his fourth PGA Tour win. For the first time in his career, Fowler preserved his 54-hole lead to win. The title saw Fowler move back up into the top 10 of the world rankings.

On June 16, Fowler carded a round of 65 at Erin Hills to take the first round lead at the 2017 U.S. Open. Fowler equaled the lowest first round score at the U.S. Open and led by one stroke from Paul Casey and Xander Schauffele. He followed this up with a one over par 73 in the second round to fall out of the lead by one stroke, held by four other players. He shot 68–72 over the weekend to finish in a tie for fifth place. This gave Fowler his sixth top-5 finish in a major, but he is still yet to win. Fowler started the PGA Championship with a 2-under 69 which was two strokes behind the leaders. After rounds of 70–73, he closed out the year's last major with a 4-under 67, including a run of four consecutive birdies on holes 12 through 15. Despite his solid finish, Fowler ended up tied for fifth and was 3 strokes behind the winner, and friend, Justin Thomas. It was his seventh top-5 major finish, meaning he's had multiple top-5 finishes at every major.

2018
On November 12, 2017, Fowler started his 2018 season at the OHL Classic at Mayakoba where he shot rounds of 65-67-67-67 for an 18-under-par total, one stroke shy of winner, Patton Kizzire. It was his 12th tour runner-up finish and he became just the 27th golfer in PGA Tour history to win $30,000,000 in Tour earnings.

On December 3, 2017, Fowler recorded a 61, 11-under-par, in the fourth round to win the Hero World Challenge. He came from 7 strokes behind the 54-hole leader, Charley Hoffman and claimed a four-stroke victory. The round of 61 was a course and tournament record, as well as being a personal best round for Fowler as a professional.

At the 2018 Waste Management Phoenix Open, Fowler birdied his final three holes during the third round to take the 54-hole lead by a stroke. This was his 6th 54-hole lead/co-lead of his career but had only converted once in the previous five attempts. In the final round, Fowler shot a 72 (+2) to finish T11.

At the 2018 Masters Tournament, Fowler shot a 72-hole score of −14 (274) to finish in 2nd place to champion Patrick Reed by 1 stroke. It was his eighth top-5 major finish, giving him multiple top-5 finishes at every major, however, he still has yet to win one.

In September 2018, Fowler qualified for the U.S. team participating in the 2018 Ryder Cup. Europe defeated the U.S. team 17 1/2 to 10 1/2. He went 1-3-0. He lost his singles match against Sergio García.

2019
In January, Fowler signed a multi-year deal to use TaylorMade golf balls and gloves. On February 3, Fowler won the Waste Management Phoenix Open after having a four-stroke lead in the final round, losing the lead, then regaining the lead for a two-stroke victory.

In December 2019, Fowler played on the U.S. team at the 2019 Presidents Cup at Royal Melbourne Golf Club in Australia. The U.S. team won 16–14. Fowler went 1–0–3 and halved his Sunday singles match against Marc Leishman.

2020
At the Sentry Tournament of Champions, Fowler finished T5th. The following week at The American Express, Fowler finished T10th. This would be Fowler's last top-10 finishes on the PGA Tour for a while as he started to struggle. 

The 2019–20 PGA Tour season was suspended due to the COVID-19 pandemic. Once the season resumed, Fowler's struggles continued with up and down results. Fowler's best results after the restart included T12th at the Rocket Mortgage Classic and a T15th at the 2020 WGC-FedEx St. Jude Invitational. However, Fowler struggled at times to make the cut at many tournaments and missed 6 cuts out of 14 tournaments Fowler played in the period of January to August. His season ended on two disappointing notes. Fowler missed the cut at the 2020 PGA Championship. For the FedEx Cup playoffs, Fowler finished T49th at The Northern Trust and failed to qualify for the BMW Championship. After a month of rest, Fowler returned to compete in the 2020 U.S. Open. Fowler finished T49th. At the 2020 Masters Tournament, Fowler would finish T29th.

2021
As Fowler continued to struggle with a missed cut at the 2021 Players Championship and a T65th at the Honda Classic, he was at risk of missing the 2021 Masters Tournament heading into the Valero Texas Open. Fowler finished T17th, and therefore missed the Masters. This was the first major Fowler missed since not qualifying for the 2010 U.S. Open. 

Fowler missed cuts at the Wells Fargo Championship and the AT&T Byron Nelson. At the 2021 PGA Championship, he finished T8th, his first top-10 finish in an event since the 2020 Sentry Tournament of Champions.

2022
Fowler's struggles continued into 2022, missing his first three cuts until a T55th finish at the Genesis Invitational. He only played one major, the PGA Championship, where he tied for 23rd. Fowler barely retained his Tour card, finishing 125th in the FedEx Cup, claiming the last spot. In the off-season, Fowler parted ways with long-time caddie Joe Skovron, who spent 13 years on the bag for Fowler, replacing him with Ricky Romano. Fowler also fired swing coach John Tillery, bringing back his old swing coach, Butch Harmon. These changes produced quick results, as Fowler finished tied for 6th in the season opening Fortinet Championship. After a missed cut at the Shriners Children's Open, Fowler tied for second at the Zozo Championship, one shot behind winner Keegan Bradley. This was Fowler's best finish on Tour since the 2019 Honda Classic, where he also tied for second.

Personal life
Fowler resides in Jupiter, Florida, relocating from Las Vegas following the 2010 season. Fowler's middle name, Yutaka, comes from his maternal grandfather, who is Japanese.  His maternal grandmother is Navajo Native American. On the final day of a golf tournament Fowler wears orange in honor of Oklahoma State University.

Fowler is one of four golfers in the "Golf Boys" group along with fellow PGA Tour players Ben Crane, Bubba Watson and Hunter Mahan. The Golf Boys released a YouTube video of the song "Oh Oh Oh" on the eve of the 2011 U.S. Open. Farmers Insurance donating $1,000 for every 100,000 views of the video. The charitable proceeds went to support both Farmers and Ben Crane charitable initiatives.

In 2012, Fowler filmed a commercial for Crowne Plaza Hotels entitled "It's Good to be Rickie" with golf commentator Ian Baker Finch. He was featured in an ESPN "This is SportsCenter" commercial with sportscaster John Anderson in 2013. On November 28, 2015, Fowler was the guest picker on ESPN's College GameDay (his picks went 7–4).

In 2015, Fowler was announced as an official ambassador for PGA Junior League Golf, a program owned and operated by the PGA of America.

Fowler has at least six tattoos. One is a block "G" near his left elbow in honor of Georgia Veach, the daughter of a Seattle pastor and friend. Georgia was diagnosed with lissencephaly. Fowler got the tattoo just before the 2015 Presidents Cup. The second is from January 2016 and contains the name Yutaka Tanaka (Rickie's grandfather) in Japanese script on his left biceps. The third tattoo came just weeks after playing at the 2016 Summer Olympics and is of the Olympic symbols. Rickie also has smaller tattoos, including a capital F at the base of his right wrist, a cross on his left index finger, and a phrase at the base of his right left wrist.

Fowler started dating track and field amateur athlete Allison Stokke in 2017. They became engaged in June 2018, and married in October 2019. The couple have a daughter, born November 2021.

Amateur wins
2005 Western Junior
2007 Sunnehanna Amateur, Players Amateur
2008 Sunnehanna Amateur, Big 12 Championship

Professional wins (9)

PGA Tour wins (5)

PGA Tour playoff record (2–2)

European Tour wins (2)

OneAsia Tour wins (1)

1Co-sanctioned by the Korean Tour

Other wins (1)

Playoff record
Nationwide Tour playoff record (0–1)

Results in major championships
Results not in chronological order in 2020.

CUT = missed the half-way cut
"T" = tied
NT = No tournament due to COVID-19 pandemic

Summary

Most consecutive cuts made – 14 (2016 Open – 2019 Open)
Longest streak of top-10s – 4 (2014 Masters – 2014 PGA)

The Players Championship

Wins (1)

Results timeline

CUT = missed the halfway cut
"T" indicates a tie for a place
C = Canceled after the first round due to the COVID-19 pandemic

Results in World Golf Championships
Results not in chronological order prior to 2015.

1Cancelled due to COVID-19 pandemic

QF, R16, R32, R64 = Round in which player lost in match play
NT = No tournament
"T" = tied

PGA Tour career summary

*As of the 2021 season.

U.S. national team appearances
Amateur
Walker Cup:  2007 (winners), 2009 (winners)
Palmer Cup: 2008
Eisenhower Trophy: 2008 (individual leader)

Professional
Ryder Cup: 2010, 2014, 2016 (winners), 2018
Presidents Cup: 2015 (winners), 2017 (winners), 2019 (winners)
World Cup: 2016

See also
2009 PGA Tour Qualifying School graduates

References

External links

Profile on Oklahoma State's official site

American male golfers
Oklahoma State Cowboys golfers
PGA Tour golfers
Ryder Cup competitors for the United States
Olympic golfers of the United States
Golfers at the 2016 Summer Olympics
Golfers from California
Golfers from Nevada
Golfers from Florida
Sportspeople from Anaheim, California
People from Murrieta, California
Sportspeople from Las Vegas
People from Jupiter, Florida
Native American sportspeople
American people of Navajo descent
American sportspeople of Japanese descent
1988 births
Living people